Shin Kamen Rider may refer to:

 Shin Kamen Rider: Prologue, the 1992 film
 Shin Kamen Rider (film), the 2023 film